Brazil, Bossa Nova & Blues (also released as Brazil Blues and Jazz Impressions of Brazil) is an album by American jazz flautist Herbie Mann recorded in 1962 for the United Artists label.

Reception

Allmusic awarded the album 4 stars stating "A slightly expanded version of flutist Herbie Mann's 1961-62 group performs African-, Cuban- and Brazilian-influenced jazz on this appealing LP".

Track listing
All compositions by Herbie Mann except as indicated
 "Brazil" (Ary Barroso) - 4:40
 "Copacabana" - 6:55
 "Minha Saudade" (João Gilberto, João Donato) - 5:12
 "B. N. Blues" - 2:50
 "One Note Samba" (Antônio Carlos Jobim, Newton Mendonça) - 4:26
 "Me Faz Recordar" (Bill Salter) - 7:55

Personnel 
Herbie Mann - flute
Hagood Hardy - vibraphone
Billy Bean - guitar
Bill Salter - bass
Willie Bobo - drums
Carlos "Patato" Valdes - congas
Carmen Costa - maracas
José de Paula - tambourine

References 

1962 albums
Herbie Mann albums
Albums produced by Nesuhi Ertegun
United Artists Records albums